Caspar Fownes (born 12 August 1967) is a horse trainer in Hong Kong. He take out his own licence in 2003/04 with 44 winners. In 2010/11 he added 56 winners for a career total of 437.

2006/07 won his first trainers' premiership. 
2008/09 won his second trainers' premiership.
2013/14 won his third trainers' premiership.

Significant horses
The Duke
Green Birdie
Lucky Nine

Performance

References
The Hong Kong Jockey Club 

Hong Kong horse trainers
Living people
1967 births